Pippo is the diminutive of the Italian names Filippo and Giuseppe, and it may refer to:

People
Pippo Barzizza (1902–1994), Italian Maestro and composer
Pippo Baudo (born 1936), Italian television presenter
Pippo Caruso (1935–2018), Italian composer, conductor and music arranger
Pippo Civati (born 1975), Italian politician
Pippo Fava (1925–1984), Sicilian writer, investigative journalist, playwright and Antimafia activist who was killed by the Mafia
Pippo Franco (born 1940), Italian actor, comedian, television presenter and singer
Pippo Inzaghi, Italian former football player
Pippo Maniero (born 1972), Italian former football player
Pippo Pollina (born 1963), Italian singer-songwriter
Pippo Pozzato, Italian road racing cyclist
Pippo Psaila (born 1957), former Malta national football team coach and current Director of Sports of the Malta Olympic Committee
Pippo Tesauro, Italian painter of the Renaissance period
Pippo Torri, Lombard far-left politician
Giuseppe Di Stefano (1921–2008), Sicilian Tenor

Other
Pentamerone, a variant of "Puss in Boots", written by Giambattista Basile
Pippo (airplane), an airplane flown over Northern Italy during World War II
A placeholder name for variables in Italian